Ocybadistes hypomeloma, the pale orange dart, is a butterfly of the family Hesperiidae. It is found in Australia in New South Wales, the Northern Territory, Queensland and Western Australia.

The wingspan is about 20 mm.

The larvae feed on Themeda triandra, Ischaemum australe and Microlaena stipoides.

Subspecies
Ocybadistes hypomeloma hypomeloma (New South Wales, Queensland)
Ocybadistes hypomeloma vaga (Northern Territory, Queensland, Western Australia)

External links
Australian Faunal Directory
Australian Insects

Taractrocerini
Butterflies described in 1911